Viktoria Ihorivna "Vika" Petryk (born 21 May 1997) is a Ukrainian singer and songwriter who represented Ukraine at the Junior Eurovision Song Contest 2008, held in Limassol, Cyprus, with the song "Matrosy" ("Sailors"). She finished in second place.

She has been singing since she was four years old. Petryk was a finalist in the Ukrainian national selection to find the Ukrainian representative in the Eurovision Song Contest 2014 and came second in the national final with her song "Love Is Lord" behind only Mariya Yaremchuk. She participated in the Ukrainian national selection to find the Ukrainian representative in the Eurovision Song Contest 2016 with the song "Overload", coming 7th in the semifinal.

In 2012, her young sister Anastasiya won that year's Junior Eurovision Song Contest for Ukraine.

Life and work
Viktoria Petryk was born on 21 May 1997 in Nerubaiske Village, Odessa, Ukraine. She represented Ukraine at the Junior Eurovision Song Contest 2008, held in Limassol, Cyprus, with the song "Matrosy" ("Sailors") she finished in second place. Petryk has entered many children’s singing competitions and won many awards and diplomas, the first being a Second Rank Diploma at the International Venok Chornomorya Art Festival in Odessa.

In 2010, at age 13, she was a contestant on the TV show Ukraine’s Got Talent 2 (Ukrayina maye talant) where she made it to the semi-final stage singing with her eight-year-old sister, Anastasiya Petryk. She also won the 13–15 years age group at the "New Wave Junior" international competition, where her sister, Anastasiya, won the younger 8-12 age group.

In 2014 Petryk competed in the Latvian festival "New Wave".

Marriage
She married in December 2016 while she was pregnant with her son David (born March 2017).

See also 
Ukraine in the Junior Eurovision Song Contest
Junior Eurovision Song Contest 2008
Ukraine in the Eurovision Song Contest 2014

References

External links 
 Official site
 Facebook account

1997 births
Living people
Ukrainian singer-songwriters
Ukrainian child singers
English-language singers from Ukraine
Junior Eurovision Song Contest entrants for Ukraine
Musicians from Odesa
21st-century Ukrainian women singers